Simmons Bank Liberty Stadium (originally named Memphis Memorial Stadium, and later Liberty Bowl Memorial Stadium) is a football stadium located at the former Mid-South Fairgrounds in the Midtown area of Memphis, Tennessee, United States. The stadium is the site of the annual Liberty Bowl, the annual Southern Heritage Classic, and is the home field of the University of Memphis Tigers football team of the American Athletic Conference. It has also been the host of several attempts at professional sports in the city, as well as other local football games and other gatherings.

History

The stadium was originally built as Memphis Memorial Stadium in 1965 for $3 million, as a part of the Mid-South Fairgrounds, then home to one of the South's most popular fairs, but now conducted in neighboring DeSoto County, Mississippi. The fairgrounds also included the now-defunct Mid-South Coliseum (formerly the city's major indoor venue) as well as the now-closed Libertyland amusement park, which has been demolished and replaced with an amateur indoor sports venue. It was dedicated as a memorial to the citizens of Memphis who had served in World War I, World War II, and the Korean War.

The facility was built partially as a way to bring the Liberty Bowl to a permanent home in Memphis (the game had started in Philadelphia, but because of poor attendance as a northern bowl, it left the city, playing one year in Atlantic City before settling in Memphis). The game was such a success for Memphis that the stadium was renamed Liberty Bowl Memorial Stadium in December 1975. As originally built, the stadium was lopsided, with the southwest side being taller than the northeast side. A 1987 expansion brought it to its current, balanced configuration, although with a much greater hospitality building topping the northeast section. Its design is similar to that of old Tampa Stadium ("The Big Sombrero"), with the endzone grandstands being much shorter than the sidelines. The field, which had been natural grass since its inception, was replaced with a FieldTurf surface before the 2005 season; this was subsequently replaced with the modern version of AstroTurf.

The stadium is designed in such a way that all of its seats have a relatively good view of most of the playing surface. This is due primarily to two design factors. The stands are relatively steep for a one-tier, true bowl stadium. Also, there is little space between the side and end lines of the playing surface and the stands. 

In December 1983, the playing field was renamed Rex Dockery Field in honor of Rex Dockery, a former Memphis Tigers football coach who had recently died in a plane crash.

The stadium played host to The Monsters of Rock Festival Tour, featuring Van Halen, Scorpions, Dokken, Metallica, and Kingdom Come, on July 9, 1988.

Tenants

Major tenants
Since its opening, the stadium has hosted the Memphis Tigers football team from the University of Memphis. Before this, the team had spent 29 seasons at Crump Stadium. It was not the first time the team had played at the fairgrounds; before playing at Crump, the team had played two seasons there at a former park.  As of the start of the 2006 season, the team had a 130-106-7 record at the stadium.

Also since its opening, the stadium has hosted the Liberty Bowl game. It annually hosts teams from the SEC and Big 12 conference.

Since 2006, the second bid has gone to a team from the SEC, setting up an all-Southern bowl game. As of 2010, the SEC has the right to override the Conference USA champion and instead replace them with an opponent from the Big East Conference, now the American Athletic Conference. At the same time, the PapaJohns.com Bowl was given the option of a Conference USA team instead of a Big East team. They chose not to do this for the first year of this arrangement, allowing C-USA champions UCF to play Georgia.

The stadium is also the host of the "Southern Heritage Classic", a game between two historically black schools, Jackson State University and Tennessee State University. The stadium also has hosted home games of the Tennessee Vols, Ole Miss Rebels, and Mississippi State Bulldogs.

The Memphis Express of the Alliance of American Football played in the stadium for its sole season in 2019.

The Memphis Showboats of the United States Football League will play in the stadium in 2023. The Houston Gamblers will play there as a hub team.

Early professional football

In 1974 and 1975, the stadium hosted the Memphis Southmen, aka "Grizzlies", of the World Football League. The Southmen drew fairly well, at least by WFL standards, in part due to the presence on their roster of some well-known players recruited away from the NFL at considerable expense.  By nearly all accounts, they would have been a viable venture had the WFL been better run.

Much, perhaps too much, was read into this relative success at the gate. When the WFL folded, the team formally changed its name to the Grizzlies and made a bid to join the NFL as an expansion team for the 1976 NFL season, with a telethon even being staged for this purpose. Over 40,000 people put down deposits for season tickets for the would-be NFL team. Despite this seemingly overwhelming show of support, the NFL ignored Memphis' pleas and the Southmen folded. Owner John Bassett filed a lawsuit against the league, but was unsuccessful.

In 1984, the United States Football League added the Memphis Showboats as an expansion team. The Showboats, featuring defensive end Reggie White and coached by flamboyant Memphian Pepper Rodgers, were one of the better draws in the league. They advanced to the semifinals in 1985. Much like the Southmen before them, it was generally believed the Showboats would have been a viable venture had their league been better organized.

However, this attempt caused the city of Memphis to decide on expanding the stadium, in the hopes of luring an NFL franchise to the city. To this end, the Liberty Bowl underwent a $12 million facelift. As mentioned above, the stands were built up to the same level as the west ones, adding about 12,000 seats, and a "skybox" of luxury suites was added to the top of those stands. After the renovation, the then-St. Louis Cardinals played an exhibition game there before a sellout crowd.

Despite its efforts, the city was unsuccessful in luring an NFL team (which would have been called the "Memphis Hound Dogs") to the Liberty Bowl.

Mad Dogs
Not willing to give up on pro football, in 1995 the Liberty Bowl welcomed the Memphis Mad Dogs as part of the Canadian Football League's attempt at bringing their league into American markets.

Due to the design features noted earlier, it was extremely difficult to shoehorn a Canadian football field onto the Liberty Bowl's playing surface.  Canadian fields are 10 yards longer and 35 feet wider than in the U.S. version, and the end zones are 20 yards deep rather than 10; few U.S. football stadiums are designed readily to accommodate a playing surface of this size. Had the attempt to play the Canadian game included an attempt to use the full width of that game's field, players not participating in the game and the coaching staffs would have to have been seated in the stands. Likewise, 20 yards past the goal line at the Liberty Bowl puts one several rows up into the end zone stands. AstroTurf sections were added around the grass field to accommodate the required width, while the end zones became half AstroTurf/half grass pentagons in order to bring the field to the required length.  However, the end zones were nowhere near regulation; they averaged around 9 yards in length, and no other American stadium had end zones shorter than 15 yards.  The stands jutted into the corners of the end zones, creating a distinct safety hazard.  The only real concession to the Canadian format that was feasible at the Liberty Bowl was the moving of the goal posts to the goal line, where they are in the Canadian game, as opposed to the end line. The result was what amounted to a hybrid game, played by Canadian rules on essentially a U.S. field.

Despite these limitations, the Mad Dogs, coached by Rodgers, drew fairly well during the early part of the season.  However, they were tripped up by quirks in the CFL schedule.  The CFL season runs from July to November so as to conclude before the harsh Canadian winters set in and make conditions unbearable for players, coaches, officials, and especially spectators.  Its games were generally scheduled for Thursday, Friday and Saturday nights—the same nights on which high school and college football games are played in the United States.  The Mad Dogs knew that once college football season started, most fans preferred to drive across Interstate 40 to watch Tennessee football or down Interstate 55 to watch Ole Miss. (The Birmingham Barracudas faced similar problems due to competition from Alabama and Auburn.)  With this in mind, the CFL moved the Mad Dogs and Barracudas' late season home games to Sunday afternoons. While this put both teams in direct competition with NFL television broadcasts, it was initially thought to be an acceptable risk since neither city was particularly loyal to one NFL team.  However, even with these changes, the Liberty Bowl became a virtual ghost town late in the season, with several crowds well below 10,000. It soon became apparent that the Mad Dogs were not a viable venture. Although they finished one game out of the playoffs, their dreadful attendance figures caused them to fold at the end of the season along with the other American teams.

Oilers
In 1997, the NFL's Houston Oilers announced that they would play two seasons in Memphis as the Tennessee Oilers before the Adelphia Coliseum, their new stadium in Nashville (now Nissan Stadium), was completed in time for the 1999 season. The largest stadium in Nashville at the time, Vanderbilt Stadium, then seated only 41,000 fans—too few even for temporary use. Vanderbilt University was also unwilling at the time to let beer be sold at games. Although the Vols' Neyland Stadium in Knoxville was slightly closer to Nashville, it was deemed too big (at over 102,000 seats) for an NFL team. Pepper Rodgers was named the Oilers' "Director of Memphis Operations." The team was to live and practice in Nashville, commuting to Memphis only for games.

Although the idea seemed acceptable enough to the league and the team at the time, the 1997 season was a disaster, because of the lack of fan ownership for the temporary team. Many Memphians wanted nothing to do with a team which would be lost in two years —especially to longtime rival Nashville.  For their part, Nashvillians were skittish about having to drive  to see "their" team play. In an unfortunate coincidence, Interstate 40 was undergoing extensive repairs just east of Memphis at the time. This lengthened the normal three-and-a-half hour drive from Nashville to Memphis to five hours or longer. As a result, the Oilers played before some of the smallest home crowds seen in the NFL since the 1950s for most games, and the visiting teams often seemed to have more supporters than the Oilers.

Even though none of the Oilers' first seven games attracted more than 27,000 people, Oilers' owner Bud Adams was initially willing to stick it out in Memphis for one more season.  However, that changed with the only game that drew more fans than could have comfortably been accommodated at Vanderbilt, the year's final game against the Pittsburgh Steelers. While 50,677 people showed up, the great majority of them (three-fourths of the crowd, by one estimate) were Steeler fans. Adams was so disgusted that he ripped up the Memphis agreement a year early in favor of playing at Vanderbilt in 1998.

Maniax
A subsequent major professional tenant was the Memphis Maniax of the first XFL. The Maniax finished tied for second place in the Western Division at 5–5 with the San Francisco Demons, but did not make the playoffs. The league folded after one season.

Other former tenants
From 1978 to 1980, the Memphis Rogues of the North American Soccer League called the stadium home. The playing surface is somewhat smaller than that generally favored by soccer, but that sport adapts to smaller playing surfaces better than some others (the preferred width of a soccer pitch is 70 to 80 yards, but the rules allow for a pitch as narrow as 50 yards wide). Like the Southmen, the Rogues seemingly did fairly well in a league that wasn't doing all that well as a whole. Despite their success, the team moved to Calgary, although this move was due more to the owner, Nelson Skalbania, a Canadian businessman, wanting to move the team to his home country.

One of the more interesting events held in the stadium was an exhibition Major League Baseball game involving the Atlanta Braves and Milwaukee Brewers during the 1975 season.  The game was sponsored by the Memphis Blues minor league team.  The right-field fence was only  from home plate, about  shorter than the dimensions of most major league parks.

Future
As of 2021, it is considered highly unlikely that there will be a permanent NFL franchise in the stadium or in the city. The stadium is more than adequate for the Tigers, a team which is currently playing in one of the larger stadiums in its current conference, the American Athletic Conference. The Liberty Bowl game is well-attended and averages crowds just under the stadium's maximum capacity. There are a variety of factors that play into the city's prospects, including:
Memphis is considered to be in the Titans’ market under the current television agreements in the NFL. Also, while Memphis is the 25th-largest city in the United States, it has always been only a medium-sized television market (currently 44th), as the surrounding suburbs and rural areas are far smaller in population than the city proper. Its per capita income is less than is customary for a market that is usually under consideration for expansion or relocation of an existing team.
The league itself is not in a position to be considering expansion at this time, in part due to there being in place a balanced schedule that works well. In addition, the city is located within  of six current teams: the Titans, New Orleans Saints, Dallas Cowboys, Atlanta Falcons, Kansas City Chiefs, and Indianapolis Colts.
Finally, the stadium itself does not meet current NFL standards. It does not have the required number of luxury boxes. Restroom facilities and concession stands seem relatively antiquated compared to those of newer facilities. The facility itself generally shows the wear and tear from five decades of use and Mid-South weather that it has endured. Perhaps the greatest hindrance is the one thing about its design that originally had made it so attractive to many. The single-deck, open bowl design precludes the construction of true "club seats", the luxury seats located between the main lower and upper decks of most modern football stadiums which are a major source of additional revenues to ownership. These factors would make the major upgrades needed to bring the stadium up to NFL standards prohibitively expensive; it would almost be certainly more practical to replace it with an entirely new structure.

On January 1, 2007, then-Memphis Mayor Willie Herenton proposed a new stadium be built in place of the old one. Some in the University of Memphis community prefer the construction of a smaller, on-campus stadium, but such a venue would almost certainly be inadequate (in terms of capacity and amenities) for the Liberty Bowl. Although this proposal did not move ahead, the long-term future of Liberty Bowl Memorial Stadium is currently unclear.  However, it is thought that a separate on-campus stadium for the Tigers would be fiscally unrealistic if a new municipal stadium were to be built in addition to it.

The most recent professional tenant was the Memphis Express of the Alliance of American Football, which played its home games played in the stadium for its sole season in 2019.

It was announced on October 1, 2021 that Simmons Bank and the City of Memphis were in advanced negotiations to have Simmons Bank become the title sponsor for the stadium and renaming it from Liberty Bowl Memorial Stadium to become Simmons Bank Liberty Stadium.

On May 12, 2022 officials revealed plans to renovate the stadium before the 2025 football season, costing around $200 million. Completed with help of architecture firm Populous, plans include:
New premium seating options on the stadiums west side.
A "halo space" surrounding the stadium.
Family boxes to the north side and party decks to the south side.
Retrofit the east side suite tower.
Construction should begin after the 2023 football season; the Tigers will continue to play in the stadium during renovations. Seating capacity is expected to remain above 50,000 after the renovations are finished.

Recent renovations
In 2013, the Liberty Bowl and its setting received a $38 million facelift.  It was repainted, and new lighting, new elevators, new turf, renovation of luxury boxes, better handicapped access, were added as part of the design by Memphis architect Tom Marshall of O.T. Marshall Architects.  In addition, two new video boards were added, costing $2.5 million and including a Jumbotron, contributed by FedEx, which is headquartered in Memphis. In addition,  Tiger Lane was created as a green space for tailgating and community events.

See also
 List of NCAA Division I FBS football stadiums

References

External links
 
 Information on the surrounding fairgrounds

College football venues
Defunct National Football League venues
Canadian Football League venues
Stadium
Memphis Showboats stadiums
Memphis Southmen
Memphis Tigers football venues
NCAA bowl game venues
United States Football League venues
Tennessee Oilers stadiums
World Football League venues
XFL (2001) venues
Sports venues in Memphis, Tennessee
American football venues in Tennessee
North American Soccer League (1968–1984) stadiums
1965 establishments in Tennessee
Sports venues completed in 1965
Canadian football venues in the United States